Mississippi mud pie is a chocolate-based dessert pie that is likely to have originated in the U.S. state of Mississippi, hence the name. It contains a gooey chocolate sauce, brownie and chocolate custard on top of a crumbly chocolate crust. It is usually served with ice cream.

While Mississippi mud pie was originally associated with Southern United States cuisine, the dish is enjoyed throughout the U.S. and beyond.

The name "Mississippi mud pie" is derived from the dense cake that resembles the banks of the Mississippi River. Its earliest known reference in print is dated 1975.

See also

 Devil's food cake
 Dirt cake
 List of desserts
 List of regional dishes of the United States

References

American pies
Chocolate desserts
Mississippi cuisine
Sweet pies